The Last Battle is a 1923 German silent film directed by and starring Harry Piel.

The film's sets were designed by the art director Hermann Warm.

Cast
 Harry Piel
 Charly Berger
 Inge Helgard
 Adolf Klein
 Karl Platen

References

Bibliography
 Bock, Hans-Michael & Bergfelder, Tim. The Concise CineGraph. Encyclopedia of German Cinema. Berghahn Books, 2009.

External links 
 

1923 films
Films of the Weimar Republic
German silent feature films
Films directed by Harry Piel
1920s German films